The Stanca Act is an Italian law of 2004 that promotes accessibility of information technology. The law also applies to Italian government websites.

History

The name of this law refers to its proponent, Lucio Stanca, Minister of Innovations during the second cabinet of Berlusconi.

The law was unanimously approved by Parliament, was published in the Italian Gazzetta Ufficiale of 17 January 2004, and became operational after more than a year.

On 16 September 2013 an update of this law was published in the Gazzetta Ufficiale. The update aligns the law with W3C WCAG 2.0 standards.

External links
 The Stanca Act (English Version).
 Mauve, an accessibility validator developed by HIIS Lab – ISTI of CNR of Pisa (Italy).

Law of Italy
Accessible information
Web accessibility